Fruntișeni is a commune in Vaslui County, Western Moldavia, Romania. It is composed of two villages, Fruntișeni and Grăjdeni.

References

Communes in Vaslui County
Localities in Western Moldavia